The women's 800 metres event  at the 1999 IAAF World Indoor Championships was held on March 5–7.

Medalists

Results

Heats
First 2 of each heat (Q) and next 6 fastest (q) qualified for the semifinals.

Semifinals
First 2 of each semifinal (Q) and the next 2 fastest (q) qualified for the final.

Final

References
Results

800
800 metres at the World Athletics Indoor Championships
1999 in women's athletics